Malli Nindu Jabili is an Indian Telugu language television family and drama series airing on Star Maa from Monday to Saturday from 28 February 2022. It is also available on digital platform Disney+ Hotstar. It stars Pawon Sae, Bhavana Lasya and Deepa Jagadeesh. The main plot of the series was taken from Bengali language television series Ishti Kutum that aired on Star Jalsha from 24 October 2011 to 13 December 2015. It is the second Telugu remake after Kongumudi, which aired on Star Maa from 19 December 2016 to 17 June 2017.

Synopsis 
Aravind, a young and gifted journalist from the city, is convincingly wedded to Malli, a simple tribal love girl. After a lengthy seven-year love affair, Aravind made the decision to wed Malini.
Aravind decides to spend a day in the tribal village of Kukunoor after visiting there one day. Meanwhile, he runs into Malli, who was forced by the locals to wed Aravind. However, the incidents that took place in the forest right before their engagement and wedding changed everything.
Unable to disclose the truth, he hires Malli as a servant and brings her home to assist his dying mother. However, as the story developed, it became clear that Malli and Malini are actually half-sisters. The program concludes with Malini reconciling with Aravind after sacrificing her love for Malli's life.

Cast

Main 

 Pawon Sae as Aravind: Malli's husband; Malini's fiancée; Anupama and Ramakrishna's son (2022–present) 
 Bhavana Lasya as Malli: Aravind's wife; Malini's half-sister; Meera and Sharath Chandra's daughter; Vasundhara's step-daughter (2022–present)
 Deepa Jagadish as Malini: Aravind's fiancée; Malli's half-sister; Vasundhara and Sharath Chandra's daughter (2022–present)

Recurring 

 Jayasri Raj as Meera: Malli's mother; Sharath Chandra's love interest (2022–present)
 Nanda Kishore as Sathya: Tribal leader of Nelakondapalli; Malli's father-figure (2022–present)
 Vijay as Sharath Chandra: Malli and Malini's father; Meera's love interest; Vasundhara's husband (2022–present)
 Sirisha Sougandh as Vasundhara: Malini's mother; Malli's stepmother; Sharath Chandra's wife (2022–present)
 Gowri Raj as Roopa: Aravind's cousin; Sumitra and Bhargavaram's daughter; Lucky's elder sister (2022–present)
 Kumrani Sridevi as Sumitra: Arvind's aunt; Bhargavaram's wife; Malli's aunt-in-law; Roopa and Lucky's mother; Nidhi's mother-in-law (2022–present)
 Roopa Reddy (2022) / Varsha (2022-present) as Anupama: Aravind's mother; Ramakrishna's wife; Malli's mother-in-law
 Lavanya Reddy as Nidhi: Arvind's cousin sister-in-law; Sumitra and Bhargavaram's daughter-in-law; Roopa and Lucky's sister-in-law (2022–present)
 Vinod as Sundar: Malli's friend and Arvind's servant (2022–present)
 Dwarakesh Naidu as Bhargavaram: Arvind's uncle; Ramakrishna's elder brother; Sumitra's husband; Lucky and Roopa's father; Nidhi's father-in-law; Malli's uncle-in-law (2022–present)
 Chinni Krishna as Ramakrishna: Aravind's father; Bhargavaram's younger brother; Anupama's husband; Malli's father-in-law (2022–present)
 Bhavya Shree as Madhavi "Lucky": Sumithra and Bhargavaram's daughter; Arvind's cousin; Malli's cousin sister-in-law; Roopa's younger sister; Nidhi's sister-in-law (2022–present)
 Meka Ramakrishna as Aravind's boss (2022–present)

Guest Appearances 
 Mukesh Gowda as Rishi (reprised his role from Guppedantha Manasu)
 Raksha Gowda as Vasudhara (reprised her role from Guppedantha Manasu)

Title song

References

External links 

 Malli Nindu Jabili on Disney+ Hotstar

Indian television soap operas
Serial drama television series
Telugu-language television shows
Indian drama television series
Star Maa original programming
Television shows set in Andhra Pradesh
2022 Indian television series debuts